Mestad is a surname. Notable people with the surname include:

Henrik Mestad (born 1964), Norwegian actor
Mette Mestad (born 1958), Norwegian biathlete
Viking Mestad (1930–2013), Norwegian banker and politician

See also
Mesta (disambiguation)

Norwegian-language surnames